Cephalops ultimus is a species of fly in the family Pipunculidae.

Distribution
Austria, Belgium, Great Britain, Bulgaria, Czech Republic, Dodecanese , France, Germany, Hungary, Italy, Latvia, Norway, Poland, Slovakia, Spain, Switzerland, Netherlands.

References

Pipunculidae
Insects described in 1900
Diptera of Europe
Taxa named by Theodor Becker